Rose Marie Angélique Bernard  (born 1972) is the current commissioner of Yukon, appointed on 12 March 2018. She is the youngest person to serve as commissioner for any of Canada's three northern territories and the first Franco-Yukonnais to serve as commissioner.

Bernard moved to the Yukon from Montreal in 1995, initially for a 4-month translation internship with the territorial government. She became an active member of the Franco-Yukonnais community, including volunteering for non-profit organizations and hosting a French-language community radio show starting in 1998. She served as Chair of the Association Franco-Yukonnaise from 2010 to 2017.

Honours and arms

Honours

Federal honours 

  Dame of Justice of the Order of Saint John — 7 June 2019

Territorial orders

  Member of the Order of Yukon — 22 March 2020 (ex officio)

Coat of arms 
Bernard's coat of arms was granted through grant of arms and supporters, with differences to Sébastien William Comchi and Samuel Nicholas Comchi, on May 15, 2019.

References

External links
 

1972 births
Canadian radio hosts
Canadian translators
Commissioners of Yukon
Franco-Yukonnais people
Living people
People from Whitehorse
Women in Yukon politics
People from Montreal
Canadian women radio hosts
Dames Grand Cross of the Order of St John
Members of the Order of Yukon